Mark Konkol is a writer and newspaper editor from Chicago.

Early life and education 

Konkol was born and raised in Chicago's south suburbs.  He graduated in 1991 from Thornwood High School in South Holland, Illinois.  He then attended Culver–Stockton College for two years, where he was a starting lineman for the Wildcats football team. He then transferred to Western Illinois University, where he graduated in 1995 with bachelor's degrees in communication and journalism.  While at Western Illinois, he was a reporter and news editor at the Western Courier, the university's student newspaper. During the spring before his graduation, Konkol was hired by the Macomb Journal newspaper in Macomb, Illinois where he covered county government and high school sports.

Professional career 

Konkol wrote for Star Newspapers. He later covered Chicago City Hall for the Daily Southtown newspaper (previously the SouthtownStar) and wrote a column for the Chicago Sun-Times' Red Streak edition. He joined the Sun-Times' news staff in 2004 and has covered transportation, Cook County courts and government and Chicago neighborhoods. In 2011, he became the paper's Writer at Large.

Among other things, Konkol wrote columns and an occasional blog for the Chicago Sun-Times called "Konkol's Korner."

In September 2012, Konkol resigned from the Sun-Times to join DNAinfo.com as the start-up local news website's Writer at Large.  In early 2017, he left DNAinfo after four years to pursue other interests, such as television production. DNAinfo folded in November 2017.

In 2014, Konkol narrated CNN's Chicagoland (TV series) documentary series.

He reports for the online hyperlocal news website Patch, which also regularly features his columns.

On February 17, 2018, Konkol was fired as executive editor of The Chicago Reader, an alternative newspaper, 17 days into his tenure. Konkol was described by staffers as "a bully and a tyrant" who berated staff in meetings. His firing was the result of his decision to publish an issue with a cover depicting racist cartoon depicting Governor J.B. Pritzker sitting on a Black lawn jockey.

In November 2021, Konkol reported that the Chicago Bears were to fire head coach Matt Nagy on Thanksgiving day. The supposed scoop turned out to be false.

Pulitzer Prize 

On April 18, 2011, Konkol, crime reporter Frank Main and photographer John J. Kim won the Pulitzer Prize for Local Reporting for “their immersive documentation of violence in Chicago neighborhoods, probing the lives of victims, criminals and detectives as a widespread code of silence impedes solutions.”

Personal

References 

1973 births
Living people
American male journalists
Writers from Chicago
Western Illinois University alumni
Chicago Sun-Times people